Terry Pearson may refer to:

 Terry Pearson (baseball) (born 1971), Major League Baseball pitcher
 Terry Pearson (immunologist) (born 1946), Canadian biochemist, immunologist, educator and biotechnology entrepreneur